Jaime Yzaga was the defending champion, but did not participate this year.

Tim Mayotte won the tournament, beating Johan Kriek in the final, 5–7, 6–3, 6–2.

Seeds

Draw

Finals

Top half

Bottom half

External links
 Main draw

Men's singles